A by-election was held for the New South Wales Legislative Assembly seat of Rockdale on 2 August 1986. It was triggered by the resignation of sitting Labor MP Brian Bannon. The by-election was won by Labor candidate and Premier Barrie Unsworth.

The Rockdale by-election was held the same day as the Bass Hill by-election.

Background 

Barrie Unsworth become Premier of New South Wales on 4 July 1986, by virtue of succeeding Neville Wran as parliamentary leader of the New South Wales Labor Party. Wran resigned the premiership after more than 10 years in the role. At that time, Unsworth was a member of the Legislative Council, whereas premiers are typically members of the Legislative Assembly. Rockdale MP Brian Bannon resigned his seat on 3 July 1986, officially to accept a government job as Chairman of the Homebush States Sports Centre Trust, but in reality to create a vacancy for Unsworth to fill.

Results 

Barrie Unsworth's transition from the upper house to the lower house was a very close run thing. Whilst Labor had held Rockdale at all times since the district's re-creation in 1941, it only barely retained the seat at the by-election. Labor suffered a large drop in its vote compared with the 1984 state election. In the finish, Unsworth prevailed by only 54 votes after the distribution of preferences.

Labor MP Brian Bannon resigned.

See also
Electoral results for the district of Rockdale
List of New South Wales state by-elections

Notes

References 

1986 elections in Australia
New South Wales state by-elections
1980s in New South Wales
August 1986 events in Australia